Checking Out may refer to:

Checking Out (1989 film), an American comedy film with Jeff Daniels
Checking Out (2005 film), a 2005 film with Laura San Giacomo and Peter Falk
Checking Out (play), a 1976 Broadway play by Allen Swift